Drudenhaus is the second studio album by the French symphonic black metal band Anorexia Nervosa. The album received very positive reviews from critics, and it meant a European breakthrough for the band.

Track listing
 "A Doleful Night in Thelema" - 4:57
 "The Drudenhaus Anthem" - 5:13
 "God Bless the Hustler" - 4:35
 "Enter the Church of Fornication" - 5:33
 "Tragedia Dekadencia" - 6:30
 "Divine White Light of a Cumming Decadence" - 4:32
 "Dirge & Requiem for My Sister Whore" - 4:17
 "Das Ist Zum Erschiessen Schön" - 5:00
 "The Red Archromance" - 5:59

References 

Anorexia Nervosa (band) albums
2000 albums